Harry Ossip Meerson (27 February 1910 – 7 May 1991) was a French photographer.

Harry Ossip Meerson was born in Warsaw, Poland in either 1910 or 1911.

His elder brother Lazare Meerson was an influential art director in French cinema of the 1920s and 1930s.

References

1910s births
1991 deaths
French photographers
Polish emigrants to France